Carex tenax, the wire sedge, is a species of flowering plant in the family Cyperaceae, native to Texas and the southeastern United States. Generally rare, it is found in the longleaf pine ecosystem.

References

tenax
Flora of Texas
Flora of Louisiana 
Flora of Mississippi
Flora of Alabama
Flora of Florida
Flora of Georgia (U.S. state)
Flora of South Carolina
Flora of North Carolina
Plants described in 1855